Otto Annkjell Hageberg (12 July 1936 – 24 November 2014) was a Norwegian literary historian.

He was born in Fitjar. He was hired at the University of Oslo in 1964, and was promoted to professor in 1985. He was a member of the Norwegian Academy of Science and Letters. Notable releases include Frå Camilla Collett til Dag Solstad. Spenningsmønster i litterære tekstar (1980) and På spor etter meining. Essay om samtidslitteratur og om litterær tradisjon (1994), and he has biographed Olav Duun and Ragnvald Skrede. He retired as a professor in 2006.

He died in November 2014.

References

1936 births
2014 deaths
Norwegian literary historians
Norwegian biographers
Norwegian male writers
Male biographers
Norwegian essayists
Academic staff of the University of Oslo
Members of the Norwegian Academy of Science and Letters
Male essayists